The pale miner bee (Perdita perpallida) is a species of miner bee in the family Andrenidae. It is found in North America.

Subspecies
These two subspecies belong to the species Perdita perpallida:
 Perdita perpallida citrinella Graenicher, 1910
 Perdita perpallida perpallida

References

Further reading

 
 

Andrenidae
Articles created by Qbugbot
Insects described in 1901